Ian Syster (20 January 1976 – 25 December 2004) was a South African long-distance runner who specialized in the marathon.

He was born in Prince Albert. He finished fourteenth at the 2001 World Championships and seventh at the 2003 World Championships. He also competed at the 2004 Olympic Games, but did not finish the race. At city marathons, Syster finished fifth in the 2002 London Marathon, and won the Beijing Marathon the following year.

He had a personal best of 13:45.37 minutes in the 5000 metres, achieved in March 2002 in Bellville, and 28:24.61 minutes in the 10,000 metres, achieved in March 2002 in Port Elizabeth. In the longer races he had 1:02:44 hours in the half marathon and 2:07:06 hours in the marathon, both achieved in April 2002 in the London Marathon. Ian Syster and his two-month-old son drowned in December 2004 in Keimoes following a car accident.

Achievements

References

1976 births
2004 deaths
People from the Central Karoo District Municipality
South African male long-distance runners
Athletes (track and field) at the 2004 Summer Olympics
Olympic athletes of South Africa
Deaths by drowning
Road incident deaths in South Africa
South African male marathon runners